Omari Nyenje (born 7 November 1993) is a Tanzanian football midfielder who plays for Namungo.

References

1993 births
Living people
Tanzanian footballers
Tanzania international footballers
Ndanda F.C. players
Kagera Sugar F.C. players
Namungo F.C. players
Association football midfielders
Tanzanian Premier League players